Huaibei Town is a town located inside of Huairou District, Beijing, China. It borders Liulimiao and Shicheng Towns to its north, Xitiangezhuang Town to its east, Beifang Town to its south, and Yanqi Town to its west. According to the 2020 Chinese Census, the town had 22,487 people residing under its administration. The name of this town was taken from  Huairoubei (Huairou North) Railway Station within the town, and it literally means "Huai(rou) North".

History 
Below is a table listing the historical divisions of the town. Before 1948, the region was divided north and south along the Great Wall of China, so the table will list the designation of land north of Great Wall above that of the south:

This town is where the 2016 Creative Commons Asia Pacific Regional Meeting was hosted.

Administrative divisions 
As of the time in writing, Huaibei Town is subdivided into 11 divisions, consisted of 1 community and 10 villages:

Gallery

See also 

 List of township-level divisions of Beijing

References 

Huairou District
Towns in Beijing